Colorado Northwestern Community College is a public community college with campuses in Rangely and Craig, Colorado, plus online. The college participates in the National Intercollegiate Flying Association (NIFA) and the National Junior College Athletic Association (NJCAA).

Craig Campus

In 1985, Colorado Northwestern Community College extended its services to Craig, Colorado.  A community of approximately 10,000, Craig is located 42 miles west of Steamboat Spring and 90 miles north of Rifle.

Originally, CNCC Craig offered classes throughout the community in facilities that were available at the time.  In 1989 the Moffat County Affiliated Junior College district Board of Control purchased the Bell Tower Building.

In 2010, CNCC built a new campus in Craig.  Located on 100 acres just north of the recently completed Memorial Hospital, CNCC-Craig Campus opened August 8, 2011. This 78,000 square foot building is LEED certified and is home to classrooms, laboratories, a virtual library, a Nursing program, Adult Learning Assistance Center and a student lounge.  Adjacent to the building is a career technical center where students can receive training in Cosmetology, Massage Therapy, Mine Safety, and Automotive/Diesel Technology.

References

External links

Colorado Community College System
Education in Rio Blanco County, Colorado
Education in Moffat County, Colorado
Buildings and structures in Rio Blanco County, Colorado
Buildings and structures in Moffat County, Colorado
Educational institutions established in 1962
NJCAA athletics
1962 establishments in Colorado